A Local Heritage List is a formal process developed by Historic England to allow community groups, local authorities and other interested groups to identify local heritage assets that may not have been deemed sufficiently to be added to the National Heritage List for England. Local listing has been identified in the National Planning Policy Framework as a way of keeping track of heritage assets identified as having local significance. These can then be taken into account along with those which have already been recognised as having national or international significance. 

The charity Civic Voice launched a campaign in support of Local Heritage Lists, providing a Local Heritage Listing Toolkit in 2018 to help local community groups to get involved in developing Local lists.

References

Historic England